DGQ-20 is a 1996 compilation album by American musician David Grisman, recorded with his group David Grisman Quintet. Spanning the period from 1976 to 1996, this triple-CD set offers 39 songs, 18 of which were not released by Grisman before. Musicians include Tony Rice, Béla Fleck, Sam Bush, Mark O'Connor, Stephane Grappelli and others.

The album includes both live and studio performances and contains collaborations with Svend Asmussen, Jethro Burns, Vassar Clements and others. Many genres are blended here, including classic American pop, instrumental jazz, Klezmer, Latin, folk, bluegrass and classical music.

Track listing

Disc 1 (1976 - 1981)
 Introductions
 Cedar Hill (Grisman)
 Theme From Capone (Grisman)
 Dawg Patch (Grisman)
 Spain (Chick Corea, Rodrigo)
 Shasta Bull (Grisman)
 Tipsy Gipsy (Grisman)
 Waiting On Vassar (Grisman)
 Key Signator (Darol Anger)
 Dawgma (Grisman)
 Swing '39 (Stephane Grappelli, Django Reinhardt)
 Ricochet (Grisman, Somers)
 Pickin' In The Wind (Mark O'Connor)
 Because (John Lennon/Paul McCartney)
 Flatbush Waltz/Opus 57 (Andy Statman, David Grisman)
 Albuquerque Turkey (Grisman)
 Mondo Mando (Grisman)

Disc 2 (1982 - 1988)
 God Rest Ye Merry, Gentlemen (trad.)
 Dawg Funk (Grisman)
 Dawgy Mountain Breakdown (Grisman)
 Free Dawg Night (Grisman)
 Syeeda's Song Flute (Coltrane)
 Lonesome Moonlight Waltz (Bill Monroe)
 Steppin' With Stephane (Grisman)
 Newmonia (Grisman)
 Prelude in C minor (Frédéric Chopin)
 Latin Lover (Vandellos)
 Sativa (Grisman)

Disc 3 (1989 - 1996)
 Svingin' With Svend (Grisman)
 Opus 38 (Grisman)
 Telluride (Grisman)
 EMD (Grisman)
 Blue Midnight (Grisman)
 Jazzin' With Jazzbeaux (Collins, Grisman)
 Rattlesnake (Grisman)
 Dawgnation (Grisman)
 16/16 (Grisman)
 Dawgology (Greene, Grisman)
 Shalom Aleichem (trad.)

Personnel
David Grisman – mandolin, mandola
Enrique Coria – guitar
Matt Eakle – flute
Jim Kerwin – bass
Joe Craven – percussion, violin

with
 Norton Buffalo – harmonica
 Jim Buchanan – mandolin, violin
 Hal Blaine – percussion
 Mike Marshall – guitar, mandolin, violin
 Dmitri Vandellos, Jerry Garcia – guitar
 Rick Montgomery, Jon Sholle – guitar
 Kronos Quartet – strings
 John Carlini, Tony Rice, Diz Disley – guitar
 Stephane Grappelli, Matt Glaser – violin
 Mark O'Connor – violin, guitar, mandolin
 Vassar Clements, Svend Asmusssen – violin
 Darol Anger – violin, mandolin
 Bill Amatneek, Todd Phillips – bass
 Rob Wasserman, Ray Brown – bass
 Jethro Burns – mandolin
 Eric Silver – banjo
 Al "Jazzbo" Collins – vocals

References

David Grisman albums
1995 compilation albums
Acoustic Disc compilation albums